The canton of Évreux-Est is a former canton situated in the Eure département, France. It had 21,769 inhabitants (2012). It was disbanded following the French canton reorganisation which came into effect in March 2015. It included a part of Évreux and the communes of: Fauville, Fontaine-sous-Jouy, Gauciel, Huest, Jouy-sur-Eure, Miserey, Saint-Vigor, Sassey, La Trinité, Le Val-David and Le Vieil-Évreux.

References

Former cantons of Eure
Évreux
2015 disestablishments in France
States and territories disestablished in 2015